Park Mi-ra (born 20 April 1987) is a South Korean handball player for Wonderful Samcheok and the South Korean Republic national team.
As part of the Korean team she competed at the 2013 World Women's Handball Championship in Serbia, the 2015 World Women's Handball Championship in Denmark and the 2016 Summer Olympics in Rio de Janeiro.

References

External links

1987 births
Living people
South Korean female handball players
Handball players at the 2016 Summer Olympics
Olympic handball players of South Korea
Handball players at the 2014 Asian Games
Handball players at the 2018 Asian Games
Asian Games gold medalists for South Korea
Asian Games medalists in handball
Medalists at the 2014 Asian Games
Medalists at the 2018 Asian Games
21st-century South Korean women